Zhezkazgan Air, branded as ZhezAir, is an airline which operates scheduled and charter flights in Kazakhstan.  It is headquartered at Zhezkazgan Airport in Jezkazgan and operates domestic flights out of its base.

Until August 2012, the Government of Kazakhstan had the majority of stocks in the company. On August 29, 2012 the government stocks were offered for purchase at the Kazakhstan Stock Exchange.

Destinations
Zhezkazgan – Zhezkazgan Airport [base]
Karagandy – Sary-Arka Airport

Fleet
The ZhezAir fleet consists the following aircraft as of February 2020:

References

External links

Airlines of Kazakhstan